5-Methyl-2-[(2-nitrophenyl)amino]-3-thiophenecarbonitrile, also known as ROY (red-orange-yellow), is an organic compound which is a chemical intermediate to the drug olanzapine. It has been the subject of intensive study because it can exist in multiple well-characterised crystalline polymorphic forms.

Synthesis 
The preparation of ROY was first disclosed in a series of patents from Eli Lilly & Co. in the 1990s, which covered the pharmaceutical active ingredient later marketed as olanzapine. In the first step, a Gewald reaction using propionaldehyde, sulfur and malononitrile formed the thiophene ring system, as 2-amino-5-methylthiophene-3-carbonitrile. The amino group was then reacted with 2-fluoro-nitrobenzene in tetrahydrofuran to provide 5-methyl-2-[(2-nitrophenyl)amino]-3-thiophenecarbonitrile.

Polymorphism 
ROY has been crystallised in at least thirteen polymorphic forms. Five of them, including red, orange and yellow examples are shown in Figure 1.

When this ability to form multiple crystalline versions of different colours was reviewed in 2010, it was described as "extraordinary", particularly because many alternatives  can crystallise simultaneously from a single solvent. As the thermodynamic properties of the various versions have been established, ROY has become an important test of computational models. By 2020, ROY held the record for having the largest number of well-characterised polymorphs, with its nearest competitors being aripiprazole and galunisertib. The various crystal forms display alternative conformers, a type of stereoisomerism where rotation at single bonds leads to a distinct three-dimensional configuration in the solid. The molecule is piezochromic, with yellow and pale orange crystalline forms which transform reversibly to red at high pressure.

In 2022, it was suggested that all the ROY polymorphs which are stable at ambient pressure have already been found and characterised. This work also calculated that additional polymorphs might be discovered using high pressures of about 10 GPa.

References 

Thiophenes
Nitriles
Secondary amines
Nitro compounds